Sbirri is a 2009 dramatic documentary, directed by Roberto Burchielli. It was released in Italy on April 10, 2009,

Plot 
The protagonist is a journalist (Raoul Bova) who is always away from home. He is advised of the death of his son Marco from an Ecstasy overdose. Even though his pregnant wife is  unstable because of Marco's death, he decides to join an anti-drug police team of the Widespread Criminality Operating Unit in Milan and films the cops' activities

Italian documentary films